The 2020–21 La Salle Explorers basketball team represented La Salle University during the 2020–21 NCAA Division I men's basketball season. The Explorers, led by third-year head coach Ashley Howard, played their home games at Tom Gola Arena in Philadelphia, Pennsylvania as members of the Atlantic 10 Conference. They finished the season 9-16, 6-11 in A-10 Play to finish in 12th place. They lost in the first round of the A-10 tournament to Saint Joseph’s.

Previous season 
The Explorers finished the 2019–20 season 15–15, 6–12 in A-10 play to finish in tenth place. Their season ended when the A-10 tournament and all other postseason tournaments were canceled due to the ongoing COVID-19 pandemic.

Offseason

Departures

2020 recruiting class

Roster

Schedule and results

|-
!colspan=9 style=| Regular season

|-
!colspan=9 style=| Atlantic 10 tournament

Source

References

La Salle Explorers men's basketball seasons
La Salle
La Salle
La Salle